Eden Alley is the second album by American band Timbuk 3. The album charted at number 107 on the Billboard 200 The album included the song "Rev. Jack and His Roamin' Cadillac Church", which was a hit on the Billboard mainstream rock chart. Allmusic's Kenneth Bays compared the album to Beck's career and stated Timbuk 3's "Eden Alley" album had similar elements. Bays had also stated the album included ironic lyrics and smart songcraft as Greetings from Timbuk3. Spin magazine claimed "Eden Alley" is as good as Timbuk 3's debut album.

Track listing
 "Tarzan Was a Bluesman" 1:26
 "Easy" 4:26
 "Reckless Driver" 5:44
 "Dance Fever" 2:42
 "Sample the Dog" 3:18
 "Too Much Sex, Not Enough Affection" 3:15
 "Welcome to the Human Race" 3:17
 "Eden Alley" 3:29
 "Rev. Jack & His Roamin' Cadillac Church" 4:13
 "A Sinful Life" 3:36
 "Little People Make Big Mistakes" 2:07
 "Reprise (Don't Stop Now)" 0:55

References

1988 albums
Timbuk 3 albums